Anna Simková (28 February 1931 – 28 July 2020) was a Slovak stage actress.

She was born in Medzilaborce. She played at the Ukrainian National Theater in Prešov from 1946. She also worked for the Alexander Duchnovič Theatre. She retired in 1991.

Simková died on 28 July 2020, aged 89.

References

20th-century Slovak actresses
Slovak stage actresses
1931 births
2020 deaths
People from the Prešov Region
Place of death missing